The Lady Wigram Trophy is a New Zealand motorsport race trophy formerly awarded to the winner of the Wigram Airfield race. It made up part of the Tasman Series and classes like Formula Holden, Formula 5000, Formula Pacific and Formula Three. The Lady Wigram Trophy is now contested by the Toyota Racing Series at Mike Pero Motorsport Park.

Lady Wigram Trophy Winners

References
 New Zealand Motorsport Archive
 Canterbury Car Club (Organiser)

 
Auto races in New Zealand
Sport in Christchurch
Tasman Series